Klein is a census-designated place (CDP) in Musselshell County, Montana, United States. The population was 188 at the 2000 census.

Geography
Klein is located at  (46.402844, -108.548378).

Demographics

As of the census of 2000, there were 188 people, 69 households, and 52 families residing in the CDP. The population density was 14.6 people per square mile (5.6/km2). There were 90 housing units at an average density of 7.0/sq mi (2.7/km2). The racial makeup of the CDP was 95.21% White, 3.19% Native American, 1.06% Pacific Islander, and 0.53% from two or more races. Hispanic or Latino of any race were 1.06% of the population.

There were 69 households, out of which 30.4% had children under the age of 18 living with them, 65.2% were married couples living together, 7.2% had a female householder with no husband present, and 24.6% were non-families. 18.8% of all households were made up of individuals, and 11.6% had someone living alone who was 65 years of age or older. The average household size was 2.72 and the average family size was 3.12.

In the CDP, the population was spread out, with 21.8% under the age of 18, 5.9% from 18 to 24, 21.8% from 25 to 44, 37.8% from 45 to 64, and 12.8% who were 65 years of age or older. The median age was 45 years. For every 100 females, there were 111.2 males. For every 100 females age 18 and over, there were 113.0 males.

The median income for a household in the CDP was $39,792, and the median income for a family was $38,542. Males had a median income of $29,000 versus $18,750 for females. The per capita income for the CDP was $15,522. About 14.0% of families and 11.6% of the population were below the poverty line, including 50.0% of those under the age of eighteen and none of those 65 or over.

References

Census-designated places in Musselshell County, Montana
Census-designated places in Montana